Evan Christopher Finnegan (born 5 August 1995) is an Irish footballer who plays as an attacking full−back. He has also represented the Republic of Ireland at various youth levels.

Playing career

Youth
Mainly playing as a full back, Finnegan played for both Cherry Orchard and Home Farm in his native Dublin. He was on the FAI's Emerging Talent Programme and has represented his country at various youth levels.

After trials with Manchester City, Blackburn and Portsmouth he joined Doncaster Centre of Excellence in June 2011.

Doncaster Rovers
Finnegan was part of the Youth Alliance Cup winning Rovers team in 2012 who won 4-0 over Exeter City at Exeter. He made his full debut in a 1-1 draw with Crewe Alexandra.

Cabinteely FC
Finnegan signed for newest LOI Side Cabinteely FC in February 2015.

College
Played collegiately for Monroe College in New York City from 2015–2016 and Keiser University in West Palm Beach, Florida from 2017–2019. While at Keiser, Finnegan was a two-time All-Conference selection and NAIA Honorable Mention All-American as a Senior.

International career

Republic of Ireland
Finnegan earned his first international cap on 15 September 2011 when he played for the Republic of Ireland U17s in a friendly against Serbia in Wexford. On 13 and 15 November 2012, he represented his country at the under 18 level in two friendly games against Switzerland in Monthey. He made his debut for the Republic of Ireland U19 squad in a 0-1 defeat to Norway at the Carlisle Grounds, Bray on 13 August 2013.

Coaching career

National Coaches of the Year winner for the 2021 season with Keiser University, helping win the programs first ever men's soccer national championship in school history.

References

External links

Living people
1995 births
Association footballers from Dublin (city)
Association football fullbacks
Republic of Ireland association footballers
Home Farm F.C. players
Doncaster Rovers F.C. players
Republic of Ireland youth international footballers
Cherry Orchard F.C. players
USL League Two players
Keiser Seahawks
Reading United A.C. players
Expatriate soccer players in the United States
College men's soccer players in the United States
Irish expatriate sportspeople in the United States
Irish expatriate association footballers
Treasure Coast Tritons players